1992 Academy Awards may refer to:

 64th Academy Awards, the Academy Awards ceremony that took place in 1992
 65th Academy Awards, the 1993 ceremony honoring the best in film of 1992